Švošov is a village and municipality in Ružomberok District in the Žilina Region of northern Slovakia.

History
In historical records the village was first mentioned in 1572.

Geography
The municipality lies at an altitude of 454 metres and covers an area of 4.273 km². It has a population of about 824 people.

External links
http://www.statistics.sk/mosmis/eng/run.html

Villages and municipalities in Ružomberok District